The Sumathi Best Television Magazine Program Award is presented annually in Sri Lanka by the Sumathi Group for the best Sri Lankan television magazine program.

The award was first given in 2002. Following is a list of the winners since then.

Awards

References

Awards established in 2002
2002 establishments in Sri Lanka